2019 State Basketball League season may refer to:

2019 MSBL season, Men's SBL season
2019 WSBL season, Women's SBL season